The Đại Nam nhất thống chí (chữ Hán: 大南一統志, 1882) is the official geographical record of Vietnam's Nguyễn dynasty written in chữ Hán compiled in the late nineteenth century. It also contains historical records of military campaigns.

References 

 

Nguyen dynasty texts